Engystomops coloradorum, also known as Colorado dwarf frog, is a species of frogs in the family Leptodactylidae. It is endemic to the Pacific lowlands and foothills of the Andes in the Pichincha and Santo Domingo de los Tsáchilas Provinces, Ecuador.

Description
Adult males measure  and adult females  in snout–vent length. The snout is subacuminate. The tympanum is small, recessed, and smooth, whereas the tympanic annulus is granular. The forelimbs are slender; fingers are without webbing. The hind limbs are short and the toes have basal webbing. All dorsal surfaces have small tubercles, and there are large tubercles on head and body. The dorsum is brown and may have an orange-brown middorsal stripe posteriorly. The limbs are orange-brown; forelimbs have dark brown markings and hind limbs have dark brown to black bars. The venter is black and heavily mottled with white or bluish white, which becomes dark brown on flanks and hind limbs. The iris is pale grayish brown or dull bronze and has fine black reticulations.

Habitat and conservation
It breeds in small, still waterbodies where it makes foam nests. It can be locally abundant but its range is small. Though adaptable, it is probably threatened by habitat loss.

References

coloradorum
Amphibians of Ecuador
Endemic fauna of Ecuador
Taxa named by David C. Cannatella
Taxa named by William Edward Duellman
Amphibians described in 1984
Taxonomy articles created by Polbot